Salma bint Harmalah also known as  was the mother of the prominent Sahaba Amr ibn al-A'as. She lived during the 6th century and was a contemporary of the Islamic prophet Muhammad. Her son Amr become Muslim in 630s. He became one of the greatest Muslim military leader.

Biography
Salma bint Harmalah was born in the Anazzah tribe, it was an Arabian tribe in the Northern Arabian Peninsula (now part of southern Jordan), Upper Mesopotamia, and the Levant.

His father, al-As ibn Wa'il, was a wealthy landowner from the Banu Sahm clan of the Quraysh tribe of Mecca. Amr's mother was bint Harmalah from the Banu Jallan clan of the Anaza tribe. 

Salma bint Harmalah had been taken captive and sold, in succession, to several members of the Quraysh, one of whom was Amr's father. As such, Amr had two maternal half-brothers, Amr ibn Atatha of the Banu Adi and Uqba ibn Nafi of the Banu Fihr, and a half-sister from the Banu Abd Shams. Her famous son, Amr is physically described in the traditional sources as being short with broad shoulders, having a large head with a wide forehead and wide mouth, long arms and a long beard.

Salma bint Harmalah died before or shortly after the start of Advent of Islam.

Claim against her
Centuries after her death, In the  4th Islamic century, a Twelver shia writer Al-Sharif al-Radi (970–1015) wrote a book called Nahj al-Balagha (Peak of Eloquence). This book made some new claims against her in the late 10th-century.

Twelver Shi'a claims

In the Shia work Nahj al-Balagha or Peak of Eloquence, Ali is quoted as saying:
I have taught you the Qur'an, clarified to you arguments, apprised you of what you were ignorant and made you swallow what you were spitting out. Even a blind man would have been able to see, and he who was sleeping would have been awakened. How ignorant of God is their leader Muawiyah and their instructor Ibn an-Nabighah.

"Al-Nabighah" is the nickname of the mother of Amr ibn al-A'as according to many Shias. He is called "son of his mother" because of his mother's reputation: once Arwa bint al-Harith went to Muawiyah and during their conversation Amr ibn al-A'as intervened. Arwa said to Amr:

"O son of al-Nabighah, you too dare speak, although your mother was known publicly and was a singer of Mecca? That is why five people claimed you (as a son), and when she was asked she admitted that five people had visited her and that you should be regarded as the son of him you resembled most. You must have resembled A'as ibn Wa'il and therefore you came to be known as his son."
These five persons were:

A'as ibn Wa'il,
Abu Lahab,
Umayah ibn Khalaf,
Hisham ibn al-Mughirah,
Abu Sufyan ibn Harb [1].
.

Sunni response to the Twelver claims
Sunnis tend to stay away from criticizing the Sahabah and their relatives. Furthermore, Sunnis maintain that slandering anyone is an unjust act, pointing to the Quranic verse 4:15

"If any of your women are guilty of lewdness, Take the evidence of four (Reliable) witnesses from amongst you against them; and if they testify, confine them to houses until death do claim them, or Allah ordain for them some (other) way."

And they maintain that because there wasn't four eye-witnesses of Layla having commit adultery as is alleged, that it is unjust to simply believe in some unsubstantiated rumors. No Sahih Sunni hadiths mention these allegations against Layla. However, it is also possible that the five visited her separately and it was not a Nikah Ijtimah.

References

Sources

7th-century Arabs
6th-century women